The Rudolf Carnap Papers are a large collection of documents and photographs that record much of his life and career. They are used by scholars and historians not only for research into the life of Rudolf Carnap but also for research into his theories and the theories of other scholars with whom he corresponded. The Carnap papers are restored, maintained, cataloged and housed in the Archives Service Center, University Library System, University of Pittsburgh. They include extensive correspondence with others, lecture outlines for courses that he taught, and drafts of his published works and unpublished manuscripts. Much of the content of the Rudolf Carnap papers is available electronically and searchable through the finding aid through the archives. His work on metaphysics being essentially a question of semantics is still cited and have been further expanded by other scholars. His papers document his being considered a major contributor on the question of metaphysics. He was also a member of the Vienna Circle.

History of the collection
The papers were donated by Carnap's daughter Hanna Carnap-Thost in 1974.

Scope of the collection
The collection is used by those researching personal information and the contents of the collection. The scope of the collection is quite large and contains information on the following subjects

Personal correspondence
Those scholars with whom Carnap corresponded were a large group.

Logical positivism
Vienna circle
Herbert Feigl
Wilhelm Flitner
Kurt Gödel
Carl Hempel
David Kaplan
Felix Kaufmann
Charles Morris
Otto Neurath
Arne Næss
C.K. Ogden
Karl R. Popper
W.V. Quine
Hans Reichenbach
Moritz Schlick
Wolfgang Stegmüller

Work in probability
Some of these documents have been digitized. A partial list consists of:
"Basic System of Inductive Logic"
Inductive Logic and Rational Decisions

References

American digital libraries
Philosophy of science
Philosophy essays
University of Pittsburgh Library System Archives and Collections